Saotomea (Saotomea) pratasensis is a species of sea snail, a marine gastropod mollusk in the family Volutidae, the volutes.

Description
The shell size is 45 mm

Distribution
This species is distributed in the East China Sea.

References

 Bail, P & Poppe, G. T. 2001. A conchological iconography: a taxonomic introduction of the recent Volutidae. Hackenheim-Conchbook, 30 pp, 5 pl.
 Bail P. & Chino M. (2010) The family Volutidae. The endemic Far East Asian subfamily Fulgorariinae Pilsbry & Olsson, 1954: A revision of the Recent species. A conchological iconography (G.T. Poppe & K. Groh, eds). Hackenheim: Conchbooks.

External links
 

Volutidae